Airbus Helicopters SAS (formerly Eurocopter Group) is the helicopter manufacturing division of Airbus. It is the largest in the industry in terms of revenues and turbine helicopter deliveries. Its head office is located at Marseille Provence Airport in Marignane, France, near Marseille. The main facilities of Airbus Helicopters are at its headquarters in Marignane, France, and in Donauwörth, Germany, with additional production plants in Canada, Brazil (Helibras), Australia, Spain, Romania, the United Kingdom and the United States. The company was renamed from Eurocopter to Airbus Helicopters on 2 January 2014. In 2018, Airbus delivered 356 helicopters, a 54% share of the civil or parapublic market over five seats.

History

Airbus Helicopters was formed in 1992 as Eurocopter Group, through the merger of the helicopter divisions of Aérospatiale and DASA.  The company's heritage traces back to Blériot and Lioré et Olivier in France and to Messerschmitt and Focke-Wulf in Germany.

Airbus Helicopters and its predecessor companies have established a wide range of helicopter firsts, including the first production turboshaft-powered helicopter (the Aérospatiale Alouette II of 1955); the introduction of the Fenestron shrouded tail rotor (on the Gazelle of 1968); the first helicopter certified for full flight in icing conditions (the AS332 Super Puma, in 1984); the first production helicopter with a Fly-by-wire control system (the NHIndustries NH90, first flown in full FBW mode in 2003); the first helicopter to use a Fly-by-light primary control system (an EC135 testbed, first flown in 2003); and the first ever landing of a helicopter on Mount Everest (achieved by an AS350 B3 in 2005).

As a consequence of the merger of Airbus Helicopters' former parents in 2000, the firm is now a wholly owned subsidiary of Airbus.  The creation of what was then called EADS in 2000 also incorporated CASA of Spain, which itself had a history of helicopter-related activities dating back to Talleres Loring, including local assembly of the Bo105.

Today, Airbus Helicopters has four main plants in Europe (Marignane and La Courneuve in France, and Donauwörth and Kassel in Germany), plus 32 subsidiaries and participants around the world, including those in Fort Erie Canada, Brisbane, Australia, Albacete, Spain and Grand Prairie, USA.

Since approximately 2006, Eurocopter has been involved in the planning for the proposed pan-European Future Transport Helicopter project.

As of 2014, more than 12,000 Airbus Helicopters were in service with over 3,000 customers in around 150 countries.

Eurocopter sold 422 helicopters in 2013 and delivered 497 helicopters that year. In 2014, AH built a concrete cylinder for testing helicopters before first flight.

In December 2022, it was announced Airbus Helicopters has acquired the Kassel-Calden-headquartered gearbox and component supplier, ZF Luftfahrttechnik from ZF Friedrichshafen for an undisclosed amount. The business will be rebranded as Airbus Helicopters Technik.

Historical emblems
Historical emblems of the company:

Products
Some of the helicopters were renamed in 2015, resembling Airbus airplane naming.
When the division changed its name from Eurocopter Group to Airbus Helicopters in 2014 the trade names of the products were changed (applied by 1 January 2016) to reflect this. Suffixes, as well as the differentiation for single or twin engines, were no longer to be used. Military versions were to be symbolized by the letter M. The only exceptions to this new branding were the AS365, the AS565, the Tiger and the NH90, which will keep their current names.

Projects
X³ rotorcraft – hybrid helicopter with two forward propellers, which achieved a 255-knot speed milestone in level flight in June 2011.
Airbus Helicopters X6 – Two year concept study into the possible launch of an 11.5t helicopter to replace the H225.
 Airbus RACER, experimental high-speed compound helicopter developed from the X³, targeting a 2020 first flight.
 Airbus CityAirbus, electrically powered VTOL aircraft demonstrator, intended for an air taxi role.

Gallery

See also

Comparable major helicopter manufacturers:
 Leonardo S.p.A.
 Bell Helicopter
 Boeing Rotorcraft Systems
 MD Helicopters
 Russian Helicopters
 Sikorsky Aircraft

References

Note

External links

 
 Airbus Corporate Helicopters
 Helibras
 Airbus Helicopters timeline at Helis.com
 

 
Airframe manufacturers of Europe
Multinational aircraft manufacturers
Defence companies of Germany
Military vehicle manufacturers
Defence companies of France
Helicopter manufacturers of Germany
Helicopter manufacturers of France
German companies established in 1992
French companies established in 1992